Minsk Innovation University was established in 1991. The university is situated in Minsk, Belarus. The founder of the institute is Nikolay Susha, a permanent rector of the university. During its existence the university has created conditions for the preparation of specialists in economics, law, psychology, foreign languages and information technology.

The university has four faculties and offers a number of programs for students, master's degree students, PhD and grand PhD students. All training in the university is conducted on a fee basis.

Faculty of Engineering and Information
Programs:

Information systems and technologies (majors): 
 Information systems and technologies (in economics); qualification of an engineer-programmer-economist
 Information systems and technologies (in management); qualification of an engineer-programmer
Informatics (web-design and computer-based graphics); qualification of a programmer
Applied Computer science (web-programming and computer-aided design); qualification of expert on computer graphics design and web application development
Management; qualification of a manager-economist
Marketing; qualification of a marketer-economist

Master’s degree courses
Programs:

Management in social and economic systems
System analysis, management and information processing (majors)

Faculty of Communication and Law
Programs:

Jurisprudence; qualification of a lawyer
Economic law; qualification of a lawyer with the knowledge of economics
Psychology; qualification of a psychologist and a teacher of psychology
Modern foreign languages (translation); qualification of a linguist, a translator (English and German languages); only full-time education is possible for this major
Design (majors):
Design (object-spatial environment), qualification of a designer
Design (virtual environment), qualification of a designer

Master’s degree courses
Programs:

Germanic languages
Psychology
Jurisprudence

Faculty of Economics
Programs:

World economics; qualification of an economist
Economics and production management; qualification of an economist-manager
Business accounting, analysis and auditing; qualification of an economist
Finances and crediting; qualification of an economist

Master’s degree courses
Programs:

World economics
Finances, money circulation and credit
Economics and national economy management
Business accounting, statistics

Faculty of Advanced Training and Retraining «Higher School of Management»
Programs:

Graphic Design
Psychology 
Economics and Industrial Enterprises Management
Finances
Banking
Accounting and control in industry
Innovation Management
Marketing
Information Systems Software.

PhD courses
Programs:

Economics and national economy management
Civil law, business law, family law and international private law

Grand PhD course
Programs:

Economics and national economy management

Library
Library of  Minsk  Institute of Management was founded on the 28 December 1994.

In 2011 e-library was created. You can find materials of conferences, seminars and e-versions of journals, published in the institute e-library

Scientific journals
Since 2005,  Minsk  Institute of Management is the founder and publisher of the periodical scientific, practical and industrial journals:
«Innovative Educational technologies» (issued four times per year)
«Economics and Management» (issued four times per year)
«Current Issues of Science in the 21st century» (issued once a year)

Rankings and Reputation
Minsk Institute of Management at present state holds 5th position in the list of top Colleges and Universities in Belarus by University Web Ranking 4ICU
Minsk Institute of Management also takes part in:
Ranking Web of Universities
Ranking Web of Business Schools
Ranking Web of Repositories

International cooperation

References

See also
List of universities in Belarus
The Ministry of Education of the Republic of Belarus: Privately owned institutions

Education in Minsk
Education in Belarus
Educational organizations based in Belarus
Universities in Minsk
Educational institutions established in 1991
1991 establishments in Belarus